The 1983 season was the Los Angeles Raiders' 14th season in the National Football League (NFL), their 24th season overall, and their second season in Los Angeles. The team began by attempting to improve on their 8–1 record from 1982 and went on to win the Super Bowl for the third time in franchise history. Prior to the Los Angeles Rams victory in Super Bowl LVI, the 1983 Raiders were the only NFL team to win the Super Bowl while based in Los Angeles.

NFL Films produced a documentary about the team's season entitled Just Win, Baby!; it was narrated by John Facenda, the 16th and final Raiders highlight film narrated by Facenda, who passed away on September 26, 1984. On November 24, 2006, NFL Network aired America's Game: The Super Bowl Champions, in which they ranked the 1983 Raiders at #20; the film was narrated by Alec Baldwin and featured commentary from players Marcus Allen, Todd Christensen and Howie Long.

Offseason

NFL draft
During the draft the Raiders had attempted to execute a 3-team trade that would have brought future Hall of Fame quarterback John Elway to Los Angeles, but this trade was blocked, and Elway was instead drafted by the Colts, for whom he refused to play, then traded to the Broncos.

Staff

Personnel

Roster

Training Camp
The 1983 Los Angeles Raiders training camp facility was the El Rancho Tropicana in Santa Rosa, California.

Preseason

Schedule

Notes:

 All times are PACIFIC time.

Pre Season Game Officials

Game summaries

Week P1 (Saturday, August 6, 1983): vs. San Francisco 49ers

Week P2 (Saturday, August 13, 1983): at New York Jets

Week P3 (Saturday, August 20, 1983): vs. Chicago Bears

Week P4 (Friday, August 26, 1983): at Cleveland Browns

Regular season

Schedule

Note: Intra-division opponents are in bold text.

Notes:

 All times are PACIFIC time. (UTC–7 and UTC–8 starting October 30)

Regular Season Game Officials

Game summaries

Week 1 (Sunday, September 4, 1983): at Cincinnati Bengals

Week 2 (Sunday, September 11, 1983): vs. Houston Oilers

Week 3 (Monday, September 19, 1983): vs. Miami Dolphins

Week 4

Week 5 (Sunday, October 2, 1983): at Washington Redskins

Week 6

Week 7 (Sunday, October 16, 1983): at Seattle Seahawks

Week 8 (Sunday, October 23, 1983): at Dallas Cowboys

Week 9 (Sunday, October 30, 1983): vs. Seattle Seahawks

Week 10

Week 11

Week 12 (Sunday, November 20, 1983): at Buffalo Bills

Week 13 (Sunday, November 27, 1983): vs. New York Giants

Week 14

Week 15 (Sunday, December 11, 1983): vs. St. Louis Cardinals

Week 16

Standings

Division

Final statistics

Statistical comparison

Boxscore

Individual leaders
Offense

1Completions/attempts
2Carries
3Long gain
4Receptions

Defense

Special teams

Scoring

Postseason

Schedule

Notes:

 All times are PACIFIC time.

Playoff Game Officials

AFC Divisional Playoffs (Sunday, January 1, 1984): vs. (3) Pittsburgh Steelers

The Raiders scored 3 touchdowns in the third quarter en route to a 38–10 win over the Steelers. In the first quarter, Pittsburgh advanced on a 78-yard drive, but when faced with fourth down and inches near the goal line, they opted for kicker Gary Anderson's 17-yard field goal. But the Raiders controlled the rest of the game, as Lester Hayes returned an interception 18 yards for a touchdown. A 4-yard touchdown by running back Marcus Allen and a 45-yard field goal gave the Raiders a 17–3 lead. The Raiders then scored three touchdowns in the third period, including Allen's 49-yard run.  Allen finished the game with 121 rushing yards and 2 touchdowns on just 13 carries, while also catching 5 passes for 38 yards. The Steelers' lone score in the second half was wide receiver John Stallworth's 58-yard touchdown reception.

AFC Championship Game (Sunday, January 8, 1984): vs. (4) Seattle Seahawks

Seattle had defeated Los Angeles twice during the regular season, but this game had a very different outcome.

The Raiders jumped to a 20–0 halftime lead en route to a 30–14 victory. The Seahawks were held to 65 rushing yards while Raiders Running back Marcus Allen ran for 154 yards, caught 7 passes for 62 yards, and scored 2 touchdowns. Lester Hayes' interception on Seattle's first drive of the game set up a 20-yard field goal. In the second quarter, Raiders running back Frank Hawkins then scored two touchdowns. In the second half, Seahawks starting quarterback Dave Krieg was benched and replaced by Jim Zorn. Zorn threw two touchdown passes, but it was not enough as Allen's 3-yard touchdown reception and another Raiders field goal put the game away.  Seahawks running back Curt Warner, the AFC's leading rusher during the regular season, was held to just 26 yards on 11 carries.

Super Bowl XVIII (Sunday, January 22, 1984): vs. (N1) Washington  Redskins

Less than five minutes into the game, Derrick Jensen blocked Redskins Jeff Hayes punt and recovered the ball in the end zone to give the Raiders a 7–0 lead. On their ensuing drive, Washington was forced to punt, but Los Angeles punt returner Ted Watts muffed the kick and Washington safety Greg Williams recovered the ball at the Raiders 42-yard line. However, the Redskins could only advance to 27-yard line.

The Redskins regrouped in the second half, and scoring on their opening drive by marching 70 yards in 9 plays. First, Garrett returned the opening kickoff 35 yards from 5 yards deep in the end zone to the Washington 30-yard line. Then, Theismann completed a 23-yard pass to receiver Charlie Brown to the Raiders' 47-yard line. Eight plays later, fullback John Riggins finished the drive with a 1-yard touchdown run. (Riggins became the second player to run for touchdowns in back-to-back Super Bowls. He had one in Super Bowl XVII en route to winning that game's Super Bowl MVP). Moseley's extra point attempt was blocked by Don Hasselbeck, but the Redskins had cut the score to 21–9 and were just 2 touchdowns away from taking the lead.

However, the Raiders completely took over the rest of the game, preventing any chance of a Washington comeback. On the ensuing drive, Washington defensive back Darrell Green was called for a 38-yard pass interference penalty while trying to cover Raiders receiver Malcolm Barnwell, setting up running back Marcus Allen's 5-yard touchdown run 7 plays later to make the score 28–9.

On the next Raiders possession, the last play of the third quarter, Plunkett handed the ball off to Allen, who started to run left. But then he saw a lot of defenders in front of him so he cut back to the middle and took off for a then Super Bowl record 74-yard touchdown run, increasing Los Angeles' lead to 35–9.

In the final period, the Raiders sacked Theismann 3 times, forcing him to fumble once, and intercepted a pass. Meanwhile, a 39-yard run from Allen set up a 21-yard field goal from kicker Chris Bahr to make the final score of the game 38–9.

Media

References

Los Angeles Raiders
1983
AFC West championship seasons
American Football Conference championship seasons
Super Bowl champion seasons
Los Angeles Raiders